Lego Life is the name for a social media app and magazine, both produced by The Lego Group.

App

Development and launch
According to Lego, the idea for Lego Life originated in monitoring how children shared their Lego builds in LEGO Club Magazine's "Cool Creations" section and posted their creations on the company's message boards. Lego Life was developed to transfer this desire to share creations into an online environment.

The app was released for Android and iOS on 31 January 2017. It was initially launched in the United Kingdom, United States of America, Canada, France, Germany, Denmark, Austria and Switzerland.

Usage 
Lego Life aims to offer an online version of the physical Lego product. A company named Crisp conducts content moderation for uploaded images before they are published on the site. The app does not offer in-app purchases, however ads for Lego are present within it. If parental consent is obtained, the app unlocks features such as commenting with free text instead of the emoticons offered by default.

Lego Life is used by approximately 9 million children around the world, across 78 countries.

Reception 
SAFE.BecauseFamily.org praised the concepts and challenges presented to children, but criticised the merchandising and advertising aspect of the app. Similarly, Common Sense Media praised the child safety functions within the app but also noted that "there's no escape from the commercial nature of this experience".

Magazine 
The Lego Life magazine is a quarterly publication that promotes use of Lego products. It is aimed at children between the ages of five and nine. Launched in 2017 as the replacement for the Lego Club Magazine, it is produced in hard copy and digital versions.

Awards and nominations

See also 
 The Lego Group
 Lego
 Lego Club Magazine

References 

Lego products
Social media
Anonymous social media